Jiaxing, alternately romanized as Kashing, is a prefecture-level city in northern Zhejiang province, China. Lying on the Grand Canal of China, Jiaxing borders Hangzhou to the southwest, Huzhou to the west, Shanghai to the northeast, and the province of Jiangsu to the north. As of the 2020 census, its population was 5,400,868 and its built-up (or metro) area made of 2 urban districts was home to 1,518,654 inhabitants.

Administration
Jiaxing is the birthplace of the Majiabang Culture in the Neolithic Age. The ancestors engaged in farming, animal husbandry, fishing and hunting 7,000 years ago.

The prefecture-level city of Jiaxing administers 7 county-level divisions, including 2 districts, 3 county-level cities and 2 counties.

These are further divided into 75 township-level divisions, including 60 towns, 2 townships and 13 subdistricts.

History

Known as a place
Spring and Autumn period: Jiaxing is known as Zuili (Drunken Plums) and is an important city in the state of Yuè.

Known as a county
210 BC: Qin Shi Huang changed the name of Jiaxing from Changshui District to Youquan.
231: Wild rice of Jiaxing informed Sun Quan of the Kingdom of Wu that there was a sign of auspice, so Sun changed Youchuan to Hexing District. This why Jiaxing's abbreviation is He. Sun also changed his era name to Jiahe in the following year.
January 242: Sun He was made the crown prince. Because of the naming taboo, Jiahe was changed to Jiaxing.

Known as a prefecture
938: (Later Jin of the Five Dynasties): Xiu Prefecture established
1117: (Song Dynasty): Jiahe District
1429: (Ming Dynasty): Xiushui District was established northwest of Jiaxing.
Early 1900s (the Republic of China): Xiushui and Jiaxing were combined into Jiahe County
1914: Reverted to Jiaxing County (because there's a Jiahe in Hunan)
1921: Chinese Communist Party founded at the South Lake in Jiaxing.
1926: Following the defection of Zhejiang civil governor Xia Chao to the Kuomintang during the Northern Expedition, the army of warlord Sun Chuanfang completely defeats Xia's largely untrained army at Jiaxing. Xia is captured and executed shortly thereafter.
1949 − 1958, 1979 (PRC): Upgraded to a city
1981: Old Jiaxing County merged into the city
1983: Upgraded to prefecture-level city

Climate

Economy

Industry is the main economic driver to the city's economy, contributing 47% to its GDP in 2015. Jiaxing is also well known as the 'hometown of silk', hence it is a famous producer of textiles and woolens.  It is one of the world's largest exporters of leather goods.  There are mechanical, chemical and electronic industries there.

Jiaxing is an important energy base in East China. Qinshan Nuclear Power Plant, the first self-designed nuclear power station in China, and Fangjiashan Nuclear Power Plant (under construction) are located in Haiyan County.

Jiaxing Export Processing Zone

Established in 2003, Jiaxing Export Processing Zone is a state-level export processing zone approved by State Council. It has a built-up area of 2.98 km2. Its development goal is to become the export processing base for IT, IC, mechanical and electrical, electronics and other high-tech industries.

Tourism
South Lake, where the Chinese Communist Party was officially founded.Wuzhen
Xitang
Jiaxing Zicheng：Jiaxing is one of the few cities in south-east China that retains any vestige of a citadel. Jiaxing Zicheng is the earliest city wall of Jiaxing.
Meiwan Street
Yuehe Street ： Zhongji Road and surrounds. Another restored neighbourhood, this one on the north side of the old city, Yuehe Street or "Moon River Street" is named after a system of canals connected to the city moat, so-called because they are curved like the crescent moon.In January 2022, Yuehe Street was named the "first provincial night cultural and tourist concentration area"

Transportation

The city is served by two railway stations: Jiaxing railway station, on the Shanghai–Kunming railway, and Jiaxing South railway station on the high speed Shanghai–Hangzhou Passenger Railway. The city is served by two long-distance bus stations: Jiaxing North Bus Station and the new Jiaxing Transportation Center. Jiaxing is on the G92 Hangzhou Bay Ring Expressway, G60 Shanghai–Kunming Expressway and China National Highway 320.

Jiaxing Air Base is being converted to a public-use airport.

Language

Jiaxing dialect is a Northern Wu dialect in the Sujiahu dialect grouping. As such, it is a sister dialect of both Shanghainese and Suzhou dialect, and easily intelligible with both. It is not mutually intelligible with Mandarin or other varieties of Chinese such as Cantonese, Hokkien or Hakka.

Religion
Local people believe in Buddhism, Taoism, Catholicism and Protestantism. Jiaxing Catholic Church and Jiaxing Vincent Abbey are well-known Roman Catholic Churches in Jiaxing.

Notable people

 Zhu Yizun, scholar and poet
 Wang Guowei, scholar, writer and poet
 Xu Zhimo, poet
 Shiing-Shen Chern, mathematician
 Mao Dun, novelist, critic, journalist
 Zhang Yuanji, publisher at Commercial Press
 Zhang Zhongjun, scientist
 Xu Kuangdi, scientist, politician
 Zhu Shenghao, translator
 Zhang Leping, cartoonist, creator of Sanmao
 Yang Borun, poet, calligrapher, painter
 Yi Ling, calligrapher and art critic
 Jin Yong, novelist
 Fan Xiping, Go player
 Miao Huixin, artist
 Shen Junru, politician, patriot
 Wu Outing, poet, painter, culture scholar
 Zhou Hanming, mathematician
 Wang Yilyu (王懿律), Olympic champion

See also
List of twin towns and sister cities in China

References

Bibliography

External links

Government website of Jiaxing 

 
Cities in Zhejiang
Port cities and towns in China
Prefecture-level divisions of Zhejiang